On the Friendly Road is a 1936 film from New Zealand which told a story of New Zealand in the depression.

It is one of four films made in 1935 (with The Devil's Pit, Down on the Farm, and Hei Tiki) which lay claim to be the first "New Zealand talkie", although dubiously, as the film was not released until 1936.

Plot
The plot involves Mac McDermitt who is wrongly accused of theft and imprisoned, but is finally vindicated and cleared. The crusading Rev Colin Scrimgeour also starred. Sam Edwards said it has one-dimensional characters so is melodramatic, and "has not improved with age".

Cast 
John Emmett Michael Mackle as Mac McDermitt

References
New Zealand Film 1912-1996 by Helen Martin & Sam Edwards p49 (1997, Oxford University Press, Auckland)   

1936 films
1930s New Zealand films
New Zealand drama films
1936 drama films
Films set in New Zealand
Films shot in New Zealand
1930s English-language films